Fadwa Al-Barghouti (Umm Al-Qassam) is a lawyer and member of Fatah council. The wife of politician Marwan Barghouti, she holds a master's degree in law in 2003 from Al-Quds University, and holds a bachelor's degree in law from Beirut University in 1997.

In 2009, she won and became a member of the Fatah Revolutionary Council elections held during the Sixth Congress of Fatah in Bethlehem. On 4 December 2016, she won again as a member of the council.

Fadwa Al-Barghouti will run in the upcoming legislative elections in Palestine on an independent list called "Freedom."

References 

Living people
Palestinianists
Palestinian women academics
People from Ramallah and al-Bireh Governorate
Al-Quds University alumni
Beirut Arab University alumni
Fatah members
Palestinian women in politics
20th-century Palestinian women
21st-century Palestinian women
1963 births